The Sapsan (known as Velaro RUS EVS) is a Russian gauge high speed electric express train. The train is a Siemens Velaro model, which in turn is based on the ICE 3M/F high-speed trains manufactured by Siemens for the German Deutsche Bahn (DB), known as the Siemens Velaro RUS.

On 22 March 2022, following the 2022 Russian invasion of Ukraine, Siemens suspended its contract to supply additional trainsets, as well as announcing it would end maintenance and other services from 13 May 2022, with Russian Railways stepping in to continue their maintenance.

Construction history 
On 18 May 2006, Siemens and Russian Railways signed a €276 million order for eight high-speed trains with a 30-year service contract worth around €300 million.

Four of the trains (EVS2) are equipped for both 3 kV DC and  operation.

Development and construction was carried out by Siemens at Erlangen and Krefeld in Germany. In August 2009, it was announced that the fifth Sapsan had been delivered to Russia, of the eight that were planned.

Four single-voltage ("EVS1", 3 kV DC powered, trainsets 5-8) trains entered passenger service at the end of 2009 on the Moscow – St Petersburg route, with the dual-system trains (EVS2, trainsets 1-4) entering service on the Nizhny Novgorod route on 30 July 2010.

On 19 December 2011, a €600 million order for an additional twenty trainsets including eight EVS2 sets was signed in order to facilitate an increased number of services on existing lines and the expansion of new service elsewhere in the system. The second-batch EVS1 sets (trainsets 9-20) will be same details as the first-batch EVS1 sets, but the second-batch EVS2 sets (trainsets 21 onward) will have retractable steps to suit for low platforms, unlike the first-batch EVS2 sets.

Operations

Since entering service in December 2009, it has been Russian Railways' only profitable passenger service, with an occupancy rate of 84.5%. According to the timetable valid from 30 October 2011, the direct train from Moscow to St Petersburg without intermediate stops needs 3 hours 40 minutes, the train from Moscow to Nizhny Novgorod 3 hours 55 minutes.

Introduction of Sapsan initially provoked cancelling of affordable daytime trains between Moscow and St Petersburg. Since the end of 2012, Moscow – St Petersburg daytime trains other than Sapsan were running again.

There were a series of stone throwing attacks against Sapsan trains. Possible reasons including cancelling of commuter trains, disruption of local transportation in rural areas, and accidents because of poor safety for pedestrians have been suggested. New bridge crossings were built, platforms along the railway were reconstructed and additional track was completed in 2015.
New Lastochka commuter trains were introduced on the Moscow – Tver and St Petersburg – Bologoye routes. Local trains in the rural areas were saved.

Route

Moscow – Saint Petersburg route 
The first and the only (since 2015) route for Sapsan trains.

Moscow (Leningradsky railway terminal) – Tver (756A, 762A, 770A, 778A, 780A) – Vyshny Volochyok (758A, 768A, 776A) – Bologoye (756A, 762A, 770A, 778A, 780A, 784A) – Uglovka (758A, 760A, 768A, 778A) – Okulovka (758A, 760A, 768A, 778A) – Chudovo (756A, 758A, 768A, 776A, 780A, 784A, 786A) – Saint Petersburg (Moskovsky railway terminal)

There are no Sapsan trains stopping at all stations on the route. The fastest ones do not stop between Moscow and Saint Petersburg at all. Numbers of the trains which stop at intermediate stations are listed above. Such measures were implemented to increase speed.

Moscow – Nizhny Novgorod route 

Former route of Sapsan trains. Since 2015, new Talgo Strizh train was introduced. All the Sapsans were directed to Moscow – St Petersburg route. Talgo trains are also high speed but more suitable for this route.

Saint Petersburg – Nizhny Novgorod route 
On 1 March 2018, Russian Railways reopened the discontinued Saint Petersburg – Moscow – Nizhny Novgorod route which allows passengers to take an 8 hour 11 minute journey without a train change in Moscow.

Tickets
On 1 July 2012, the Russian Railways company introduced a new tariff system for Sapsan trains which dynamically prices tickets based on two factors:
 The date of sale of the ticket,
 Percentage of occupied seats on the train.

The new rates range from 0.8 to 1.2 times the base rate for the day. It is possible to see the final price of a ticket for a specific date during the booking process.

See also
 History of rail transport in Russia
 Siemens Velaro

References

External links 

 Siemens Velaro RUS Sell Sheet
 Velaro RUS pdf Siemens Page (archived)
 Velaro high-speed train for Russia / A. Lipp, John D., R. Mangler, VA Gapanovich, AS Nazarov, ON Nazarov, VP Shilkin / / Railways of the World, 2009, No1, pp.36-50. 
 St. Petersburg - Moscow - Nizhny Novgorod 
Official web page on Russian Railways

Electric multiple units of Russia
Siemens Velaro
High-speed rail in Russia
High-speed trains of Russia
Passenger trains running at least at 250 km/h in commercial operations
Railway services introduced in 2009
3000 V DC multiple units
25 kV AC multiple units